

General information
Basic general information about the browsers. Browsers listed on a light purple background are discontinued. Platforms with a yellow background have limited support.

Operating system support
Browsers are compiled to run on certain operating systems, without emulation.

This list is not exhaustive, but rather reflects the most common OSes today (e.g. Netscape Navigator was also developed for OS/2 at a time when macOS 10 did not exist) but does not include the growing appliance segment (for example, the Opera web browser has gained a leading role for use in mobile phones, smartphones, the Nintendo DS and Wii, and Personal Digital Assistants, and is also used in some smart TVs).
Both the web browser and OS means most recent version, example: Windows 11 with Internet Explorer 11.

Browser features
Information about what common browser features are implemented natively (without third-party add-ons).

Accessibility features
Information about what common accessibility features are implemented natively (without third-party add-ons). Browsers that do not support pop-ups have no need for pop-up blocking abilities, so that field is marked as N/A.

Accessibility features (continued)
Information about what common accessibility features are implemented natively (without third-party add-ons).

Web technology support
Information about what web standards, and technologies the browsers support, except for JavaScript. External links lead to information about support in future versions of the browsers or extensions that provide such functionality.

Plugins and syndicated content support
Information about what web standards, and technologies the browsers support. External links lead to information about support in future versions of the browsers or extensions that provide such functionality.

JavaScript support
Information about what JavaScript technologies the browsers support. Note that although XPath is used by XSLT, it is only considered here if it can be accessed using JavaScript. External links lead to information about support in future versions of the browsers or extensions that provide such functionality, e.g., Babel.

See what parts of DOM your browser supports

Protocol support
Information about what internet protocols the browsers support (in addition to HTTP that all (modern) browser should and do fully support). External links lead to information about support in future versions of the browsers or extensions that provide such functionality.

More than half of web traffic from Chrome to Google's servers is handled by QUIC protocol, not TCP (or HTTP/1). Chrome (and Opera) have support for QUIC, and HTTP/3.

Image format support
Information about what image formats the browsers support. External links lead to information about support in future versions of the browsers or extensions that provide such functionality.

Internationalization
Most browsers are available in more than one language.

See also
 History of the web browser
 List of web browsers
 Comparison of browser engines
 Comparison of lightweight web browsers
 Version history for TLS/SSL support in web browsers
 Usage share of web browsers
 Comparison of download managers
 Browser security
 Browser wars
 HTML5 video browser support
 HTML5 audio supported audio coding formats

References

Web browser comparisons
Online services comparisons